Diocirea microphylla is a plant in the figwort family (Scrophulariaceae), and is endemic to a small area near Coolgardie in Western Australia. It is a low shrub with thin branches and minute leaves pressed against the stems. It is readily distinguished from the other three species in the genus by its tiny leaves.

Description

The flowers are borne singly in leaf axils and lack a stalk. There are 5 egg-shaped, pointed green sepals joined together at their base. The tube is mostly glabrous except for a few hairs on the bottom lobe. There are 4 stamens which extend slightly beyond the petal tube.

Taxonomy and naming
Diocirea microphylla was first formally described by taxonomist Bob Chinnock in Eremophila and allied genera: a monograph of the plant family Myoporaceae in 2007 from a specimen collected near Coolgardie. Chinnock states that the specific epithet is derived from "Greek microphylla, small leaves". In ancient Greek, the feminine adjective mikrophyllos (μικρόφυλλος) means "with small leaves", the same meaning that is ascribed to the feminine adjective microphylla in botanical Latin.

Distribution and habitat
Diocirea microphylla occurs in a small area north of Coolgardie in the Coolgardie biogeographic region where it grows in woodland on clay loam. Only a few populations are known but in several of these it forms an almost continuous ground cover with thousands of individual plants.

Conservation
Diocirea microphylla has been classified as "Priority Three" by the Government of Western Australia Department of Parks and Wildlife meaning that it is poorly known and known from only a few locations but is not under imminent threat.

References

microphylla
Lamiales of Australia
Plants described in 2007
Endemic flora of Western Australia